Why Wait may refer to:
Why Wait (album), by Kristy Lee Cook
"Why Wait" (song), by Rascal Flatts
"Why Wait" (Shakira song), by Shakira